Nathan Militzok (May 3, 1923 – May 14, 2009) was an American professional basketball player. He played the forward position for various teams, including the New York Knicks.

Early life
Militzok, who was Jewish, was born in The Bronx, New York. Recalling his childhood, he said: "I never saw a dirt field. Everything was cement. ... We had two choices: either go to the schoolyard and play ball or hang around on the corner and get in trouble. So, we played basketball all our lives." He attended Stuyvesant High School, where he played for the basketball team.

He began his college basketball career as a freshman at CCNY in 1941, playing for a team that had a 16–1 record.  He then transferred to Hofstra University.  World War II broke out, and he joined the Navy. Stationed at Cornell University, he joined its basketball team for the 1943–44 season.

Professional career
After the end of World War II, Militzok joined the New York Knicks in 1946 in the Basketball Association of America, which merged with the National Basketball League in 1949 to become the NBA. Militzok played in the first game in NBA history for the Knicks against the Huskies on November 1, 1946, and was credited with the first assist in the league's history.  He was traded to the Toronto Huskies in February 1947 for cash.

He joined the Scranton Miners of the American Basketball League in 1948–49.  He played with them through 1951–52, when he was sent to the Saratoga Harlem Yankees.

Later life
After his basketball career, he became an attorney.

In 1999, he and the other Jewish players on the Knicks, Sonny Hertzberg, Ralph Kaplowitz, Leo Gottlieb, Hank Rosenstein, and Ossie Schectman, were inducted into the National Jewish Sports Hall of Fame in New York.

BAA career statistics

Regular season

References

1923 births
2009 deaths
American expatriate basketball people in Canada
American men's basketball players
United States Navy personnel of World War II
Basketball players from New York City
CCNY Beavers men's basketball players
Cornell Big Red men's basketball players
Forwards (basketball)
Hofstra Pride baseball players
Jewish men's basketball players
New York Knicks players
Scranton Miners players
Sportspeople from the Bronx
Stuyvesant High School alumni
Toronto Huskies players